The Amas–Darbhanga Expressway (NH-119D) or Gaya–Darbhanga Expressway is an approved 4/6-lane wide access-controlled expressway in India. NH-119D connects Amas village in Gaya district to Bela Nawada village in Darbhanga district. The Kacchi Dargah-Bidupur bridge is a part of this project.

Route
It will pass through 7 districts of Bihar i.e. Aurangabad, Gaya, Nalanda, Jehanabad, Patna, Vaishali and Darbhanga. The route of Amas–Darbhanga Expressway from south to north is as follows:

 Amas (NH-19)
 Bela Nawada (NH-27)

Construction
The construction work of Amas–Darbhanga Expressway has been divided into 4 packages by the NHAI.

Status updates
 Nov 2022: Transport Minister Nitin Gadkari will lay down the foundation stone soon.

References

Highways in India
Transport in Darbhanga